Watergardens railway station is located on the Sunbury line in Victoria, Australia. It serves the western Melbourne suburb of Sydenham, and it opened on 26 January 2002.

A stabling yard is located at the Down (Sunbury) end of the station.

History

Sydenham
Sydenham station originally opened on 1 March 1859, shortly after the railway line was extended from Sunshine to Sunbury. When it opened, it was named Keilor Road. On 1 April 1887, it was renamed Sydenham.

In 1926, interlocked gates were provided at the former Melton Highway level crossing, which was located at the Down end of the station. In 1987, they were replaced with boom barriers. In 1989, a rail siding at the station was abolished, as well as a number of signal posts.

Watergardens
In 2002, as part of the extension of the electrified network from St Albans, Sydenham was closed, and a new station was built approximately 600m in the Up direction. Opening on 26 January of that year, the new station was named Watergardens, after the adjacent Watergardens Shopping Centre. The new station was to be called Sydenham, with the name being built into the brickwork of the station building. However, naming rights were sold to the shopping centre. The name "Sydenham" can still be seen on the side of the building adjacent to Platform 3. Around 2012, the Sydenham name was dropped, with the station now generally referred to as Watergardens.

In late 2002, the Melton Highway level crossing was upgraded, in conjunction with the duplication of the highway. In 2015, the Level Crossing Removal Authority announced the grade separation of the highway and railway line. In January 2018, the level crossing was removed, with the project completed in October of that year.

In 2022, all three platforms were extended from 160m to 163m long.

Platforms and services

Watergardens has one side platform, and one island platform with two faces. It is served by Sunbury line trains, as well as a limited number of V/Line services on the Bendigo and Swan Hill lines.

Platform 1:
  all stations and limited express services to Flinders Street; terminating services
  three weekday morning V/Line services to Southern Cross (set down only)
  V/Line services to Southern Cross (set down only)

Platform 2:
  terminating services; all stations and limited express services to Flinders Street

Platform 3:
  all stations services to Sunbury
  one weekday evening V/Line service to Bendigo (pick up only)
  V/Line services to Swan Hill (pick up only)

By late 2025, it is planned that trains on the Sunbury line will be through-routed with those on the Pakenham and Cranbourne lines, via the new Metro Tunnel.

Transport links

CDC Melbourne operates four routes to and from Watergardens station, under contract to Public Transport Victoria:
 : to St Albans station
 : to St Albans station
 : to St Albans station
 : to Caroline Springs Town Centre

Kastoria Bus Lines operates four routes to and from Watergardens station, under contract to Public Transport Victoria:
 : to Caroline Springs station
 : to Caroline Springs station
 : to Hillside
 : to Moonee Ponds Junction

Transit Systems Victoria operates three routes to and from Watergardens station, under contract to Public Transport Victoria:
 : to Sunshine station
  : to Sunshine station (Saturday and Sunday mornings only)
  : to Melton (Saturday and Sunday mornings only)

References

External links
 Melway map at street-directory.com.au

Premium Melbourne railway stations
Railway stations in Melbourne
Railway stations in Australia opened in 1859
Railway stations in the City of Brimbank